Lazar Vujadin Samardžić (born 24 February 2002) is a Serbian professional footballer who plays as a midfielder for Serie A club Udinese.  Although a midfielder, he can also play as a left winger.

Club career

Hertha BSC

Youth
Samardžić played for BSV Grün-Weiss Neukölln 1950 e.V. from 2008 to 2009 and joined Hertha BSC from 9 October 2009.  Samardžić played for the U17 and U19 teams of Hertha BSC in the Under 17 and Under 19 Bundesliga, scoring 16 and 14 goals respectively.  Samardžić won the bronze award of the Fritz Walter Medal in the U17 group.

First team
Samardžić was announced to have signed a professional contract, and first appeared as an unused substitute for the professional team in a 3–3 away draw against Fortuna Düsseldorf on 28 February 2020.

Samardžić made his debut for Hertha BSC in the Bundesliga on 22 May 2020, coming on as a substitute for Per Ciljan Skjelbred in the 81st minute of the Berlin derby against Union Berlin, which finished as a 4–0 win. Samardzic is considered one of Germany's most talented prospects and he had attracted serious interest from elite clubs around the world, such as Chelsea, Barcelona and Juventus.

RB Leipzig
On 8 September 2020, Samardžić joined fellow Bundesliga side RB Leipzig on a five-year deal. He made his RB Leipzig debut on 3 October, coming off the bench in a 4-0 win against FC Schalke 04.

Udinese
Ahead of the 2021–22 season, 19-year-old Samardžić  moved to Italian Serie A club Udinese. He signed a five-year contract.

International career
Samardžić played for Berlin at the Under-15 level and Germany at the Under-17 and Under-19 levels. He first appeared internationally and played two matches in the 2019 UEFA European Under-17 Championship qualification against Belarus and Slovenia.  He then played in all three matches of the group stage of the tournament, scoring once, but the team failed to progress to the knockout stage. For the U-19 level, he played in the 2020 UEFA European Under-19 Championship qualification, scoring twice.

Serbian national team
In February 2023, the Football Association of Serbia announced that Samardžić had accepted manager Dragan Stojković's invitation to switch his allegiance to Serbia on his 21st birthday. He subsequently received his first official call-up to the Serbian senior national team the following month, being included in the list for the UEFA Euro 2024 qualifying matches against Lithuania and Montenegro.

Personal life
Samardžić was born in Berlin, and is of Bosnian Serb descent. His father hails from Živinice.

Career statistics

Club

Honours
Individual
Fritz Walter Medal U17 Bronze: 2019

References

External links
 
 
 

2002 births
Living people
Footballers from Berlin
German footballers
Germany youth international footballers
Germany under-21 international footballers
German people of Serbian descent
Association football midfielders
Hertha BSC players
Hertha BSC II players
RB Leipzig players
Udinese Calcio players
Bundesliga players
Regionalliga players
Serie A players
German expatriate footballers
Expatriate footballers in Italy